Clayton Akira Sato (born July 20, 1999) is a Guamanian footballer who plays as a forward for the Guam national football team.

Career

College
In January 2017, Sato committed to play at San Francisco State University. In his freshman season, Sato made just five appearances, none of which were starts, scoring once. He played a much more prominent role during his sophomore season, scoring four goals in 17 appearances, 10 of which were starts.

International
In May 2021, Sato was called up to the Guam national football team. He made his senior international debut on May 30, 2021, in a 7-0 World Cup qualifying defeat to China.

Career statistics

International

References

External links

1999 births
Living people
Guam international footballers
Guamanian footballers
Association football forwards
Soccer players from Honolulu